Myers Grove School was a secondary school (11–16) in the north-west of Sheffield, South Yorkshire, England. The school was bidding to become a businesses and enterprise college.  It has now merged with Wisewood School & Community Sports College to become Forge Valley Community School, opened in September 2011.

Myers Grove opened in about 1960 as the first purpose-built comprehensive school in Sheffield. It originally had a 6th form, lost in a reorganisation in 1988, when the Lower School buildings became the Wood Lane buildings of Loxley College, part of Sheffield College.

Headteachers of Myers Grove School 
1960 - 1978 William Hill
1978 - 1993 Roy Yates
1993 - 1998 David Lowe
1998 - 2003 Gerry Richardson
2003 - 2004 John Hull
2004 - 2008 John Wilkinson
2008 - 2011 Andrew Ireland (acting head) / Diane McKinley (executive head)

Andrew Ireland was appointed acting head, with Diane McKinley in overall charge during the ongoing merger with Wisewood School as executive head. The proposed merger was opposed by a group of parents despite the opposition being rejected by the High Court in early 2007.

Notable former pupils
 Kate Bottley, Anglican priest, TV personality, and journalist
 Paul Carrack - musician. Formerly of Squeeze.
 Jonathan Harston - Sheffield City Councillor for Walkley 1999–2010, Brightside Parliamentary candidate 2005–2015.
 Chris Turner - former Sheffield Wednesday goalkeeper and Manager.

References

External links
OFSTED report, October 2003, retrieved 11 February 2007

Defunct schools in Sheffield
Educational institutions established in 1960
1960 establishments in England
Educational institutions disestablished in 2011
2011 disestablishments in England